Chaetostomella steropea is a species of tephritid or fruit flies in the genus Chaetostomella of the family Tephritidae.

Distribution
Italy, Greece.

References

Tephritinae
Insects described in 1870
Diptera of Europe
Taxa named by Camillo Rondani